Spliced (also known as The Wisher) is a 2002 Canadian supernatural slasher film directed by Gavin Wilding and starring Ron Silver, Liane Balaban and Drew Lachey. The film was released on December 1, 2002, in Canada.

Plot
A teenage girl who loves horror movies watches them all the time, yet is never frightened. Despite never being frightened, she begins to sleepwalk out of her house, resulting in her parents getting angry. They forbid her to watch any more horror movies in an attempt to prevent her sleepwalking, however there's a new movie called "The Wisher" out which is a huge hit with all her friends. Her father tells her she's not allowed to see it, but she sneaks out anyway. Before she leaves, she says "I wish he would just go away" and goes and sees the movie. Surprisingly, a scene in the movie is too much for her and she leaves. Her dad goes after her but then dies unexpectedly in a car accident. She then notices one of the characters in the movie following her around and whenever she makes a wish for something bad the wisher grants it.

Cast

External links

2002 films
2002 horror films
Canadian supernatural horror films
English-language Canadian films
Films about wish fulfillment
Canadian slasher films
2000s English-language films
2000s Canadian films